KSAZ (580 AM) is a commercial radio station located in Marana, Arizona, broadcasting to the Tucson, Arizona, area. It is currently under ownership of KASA Radio Hogar, Inc.  KSAZ airs a Spanish-language religious talk and music format.

History

KJMM signed on in 1987. It was owned by Elliott-Phelps Broadcasting Corporation and used the facilities of the former KIKX, which had signed off the air five years earlier. In 1990, KJMM became KSAZ and relocated to Marana.

Prior to March 1, 2009, it was airing country music format courtesy of ABC Radio's Real Country satellite feed. Prior to September 1, 2008, it was airing an adult standards format.

External links
 
 
 
 Radio Ebenezer Facebook

SAZ
SAZ
Religious radio stations in the United States
Radio stations established in 1987
1987 establishments in Arizona